Pallom is a block situated 6.5 km south of Kottayam town and 12.4 km north of Changanassery, in the Kerala State. The nearest airport is the Cochin Nedumbassery International Airport (Airport code: COK) which can be reached within 2 hours.  Nearest local railway station is Chingavanam (3.6 km) and Major railway station is Kottayam (6 km).

History
Under the ruling of Munjanadu Dynasty, Nattakom area was divided in to 28 different Karas (province) and Pallom was one of the Karas. During that period, the local ruling was performed by the Mechery Panikkar, Perumthurithy Kurup, Parambathu Kurup and Chediyattu Kurup. Ilaya Raja Vimbileeswaran of Thekkumkur Dynasty conquered Munjanad in 1103AD and the Royal Edathil family built many palaces including Edathil Palace at Pallom. On 11 September of 1749AD, Ramayyan Dalawa the prime minister of Marthanda Varma conquered Thekkumkur and merged it to the Travancore Kingdom.

The Edathumpadickal family was the first Syrian (Suriyani) Christian family settled in Pallom-Nattakam area (Ref 5: India Gazetteer and Bhoomishasthra Nighandu" by Joseph Edamaruk and R K Kartha published in 1977). Ittymaathu a Syrian Christian whose predecessors were traditionally the Captain of the Guard (Akambady Nayakan) of Thekkumkur Raja, had been brought in by the Edathil Thampuran from Angamaly to Kottayam in AD 1685 and constructed a house for them in front of the Pallom Edathil Palace and named the house Edathin Padikkal(Now Edathumpadickal). This was for the purpose of purifying things bought for the Temples and Palaces as, it was a belief of the time that things can be purified by the touching of a traditional Suriyani Christian(Ref : "Thekkumcore Charithravum Puravrithavum" by Prof: M E Kesavan Namboothiri published in 2014 by NBS, Ref : "Madhyakerala Charithraveekshanam-Mangattu muthal Chengalam vare" by Mangattu John Abraham published in 2013).The migration of the other Syrian Christians started after that. There are quite a few Syrian Christian families belonging to the Orthodox, Jacobite and CSI sects here and most of them are related by blood. This include mainly the Parekadavil, Kannampuram and Ennackal families all of whom who claim to be in the lineage of one among the first four Brahmin families who embraced Christianity through St.Thomas the disciple of Jesus Christ. The Rama temple in the Edathil Palace premise is popular among devotees.

Demographics
It is a quiet community with religion being the centre of life. It was an agriculture-based community with strong linkages to seasonal paddy cultivation. However, many of the residents are employed with the local government or the other establishments in and around Kottayam. Some of the residents might have left to work abroad but the proportion is very low.  Nothing much has changed in the last half century in Pallom. The calm is broken by a local temple or church festival or the odd election. With its direct access to the backwaters, a few of the locals fish and live off the water. Trade connected with fishing and paddy cultivation was the major occupation in the past.  The possibility of floods due to large monsoon downpours used to bother the residents of the lower lying areas.

Education
This is indeed an early centre for education pioneered by the British Missionaries. CMS Middle School (The present day CMS Higher Secondary School is the successor) was probably the first English school in Travancore. Buchanan Girls' school was the pioneer in Girls education.

Temples and churches
The major religions are Christianity and Hinduism.

St. Paul's Orthodox Syrian Church (Mundakathil Pally), St. Ignatius JSO Church (Kallooparamban Pally), St. John the Baptist CSI Syrian Church and St. Andrew's CSI Syrian Church are the churches in this area.

The Sri Dharma Sastha Hindu Temple at Pakkil is an ancient one and has got a festival called Pakkil Vanibham (fair of locally made house hold items) on the 1st of the Malayalam month of Karkidakom (July–August) every year. There is an intriguing tale behind the conduct of this fair. Legend has it that Lord Parasurama, the creator of Kerala as per mythology, who arrived at this place to set up a temple found difficulty in installing the idol of Dharma Sastha (Lord Ayyappa). He sought help from Pakkanar, another legendary character, who had arrived to sell traditional wares such as Kutta and Muram. It is believed by the devotees that Pakkanar installed the idol saying "Ivide parkku" meaning 'you stay here' and the idol got affixed. Pleased, Lord Parasurama let Pakkanar come here every year and sell his wares (Kutta and Muram). This tradition was carried forth by the descendants of Pakkanar and continues till date. It is believed by the devotees that the term 'Parkku' became 'Pakkil' over the years and thus the place got named as Pakkil. This is one of the 8 temples have been consecrated by Lord Parasurama as per Kottarathil Shankunni's famed tome "Aeithiha Mala".

Sri Seetharamapuram Temple and Cheruvallikkavu are the other Hindu temples in the area, which are built by Edathil Palace. The Lord Hanuman statue situated in Athreya ayurvedic centre is one of the tallest (35 feet including the base) Lord Hanuman statue in Kottayam. SNDP Yogam has a large place of worship and other establishments here. However, Muslims are very less in number.

The famous pilgrim centre Dakshina Mookambi Panachikkad Sri Saraswathi Temple is 7.4 km East of Pallom. The famous Hanuman statue situated in Athreya ayurvedic centre, Pallom.

Community life
The local Jolly Toddy Shop (Karumpumkala) is very popular across Kerala for its seafood and local toddy. Another important institution in the locality is Athreya Ayurvedic Centre, which is run by a family of Doctors with a tradition of 5 Generations. This ayurvedic resort is founded by Dr.B.Gireesh.

Kalloopparampan(Kallooparamban) Chundan Vallam(Snake Boat) which has won Nehru Trophy 6 times and many other boat races, is owned by Pallom Kalloopparambil house of Edathumpadickal family.

Prominent personalities

Pallom Madhavan was a legendary Kadhakali Musician. Initially, he learned Carnatic Music from Pallathu Kottaram Asthaana Sangeetha Vidwan Sri Rudra Warrier. Later, he learned Kadhakali Music from Kurichy Picheppally Raman Asaan. He joined Kerala Kalamandalam as Kadhakali Music Instructor and retired as Vice Principal of Kerala Kalamandalam in 1989. He visited many countries such as France, Italy, Germany, Russia, Iran, China, Japan, America etc. and has performed his art. He has contributed majorly in converting many epics to Kadhakali form. He died in 2012 at his house in Panachikkadu. He was the winner of many awards including Kalamandalam Award, State Kadhakali Award 2011.

Ennackal Chandy George Sudarshan (16 September 1931 – 14 May 2018). Sudarshan was born in Pallom Ennakkal family, Kottayam, Kerala. He was an Indian theoretical physicist and a professor at the University of Texas. Sudarshan has been credited with numerous contributions to the field of theoretical physics, including Glauber–Sudarshan P representation, V-A theory, tachyons, quantum Zeno effect, open quantum system and Lindblad equation, spin–statistics theorem, non-invariance groups, positive maps of density matrices, and quantum computation.

Power station
When the Travancore state set up a generating station at Pallivasal, the power sub-station was set up at Pallom.

See also 
 Kottayam
 Kottayam district
 Kottayam-Malabar

References

Villages in Kottayam district